The 2019 season of competitive association football in Malaysia.

Promotion and relegation

Pre-season

New and withdrawn teams

New teams 
 PJ City (Liga Super)

Withdrawn teams 
 Felcra (Liga Super)

National team

Malaysia national football team

2019 Airmarine Cup

Friendly

2022 World Cup qualification

Malaysia national under-22 football team

2020 AFC U-23 Championship qualification

2019 Southeast Asian Games

2019 AFF U-22 Youth Championship

Malaysia national under-19 football team

2020 AFC U-19 Championship qualification

2019 AFF U-19 Youth Championship

Malaysia national under-16 football team

2020 AFC U-16 Championship qualification

2019 AFF U-15 Youth Championship

League season

Liga Super

Liga Premier

Liga M3

Liga M4 

 Liga Melaka Division 1
 KLFA Super League
 Liga THB-KFA
 Subang Football League
 Terengganu Amateur League
 MAHSA M4 League
 Alumni M4 League
 Puchong Community League
 Shah Amateur League
 Selangor Social Premier League
 Sultan Johor Cup
 Perlis Amateur League
 PBNS Cup
 Klang Valley M4 League
 Play-off round

Domestic Cups

Charity Shield

FA Cup

Malaysia Cup

Malaysia Challenge Cup 

1−1 on aggregate. Johor Darul Ta'zim II won 6−5 on penalty after extra time.

Malaysian clubs in Asia

Johor Darul Ta'zim

AFC Champions League

Group stage

Perak

AFC Champions League

Qualifying play-offs

Notes

References